Żeniówka, also known as Ziniówka, Ziuniuwka or Ziniejowka, was a Polish settlement in the Wołyń Voivodeship (1921–1939), gmina Warkowicze, Dubno county, on the Ikva River, in Second Polish Republic before the Nazi German and Soviet invasion of Poland in September 1939.

The village (area now in Ukraine) was the site of Ukrainian Insurgent Army (UPA) ethnic cleansing of Poles between 1942 and 1945. The village no longer exists.

See also
 Massacres of Poles in Volhynia

References

Sources
 Władysław and Ewa Siemaszko, Ludobójstwo dokonane przez nacjonalistów ukraińskich na ludności polskiej Wołynia 1939 - 1945. WYKAZ MIEJSCOWOŚCI; accessed 13 December 2014.
 Leonard Urbanowicz, Spis miejscowości powiatu DUBIEŃSKIEGO w województwie wołyńskim , wolyn.ovh.org; accessed 13 December 2014.

Villages in Wołyń Voivodeship
Massacres of Poles in Volhynia
War crimes committed by the Ukrainian Insurgent Army
Massacres in the 1940s
Massacres in 1940